Péter Vincze (born 23 November 1975) is a Hungarian alpine skier. He competed in three events at the 2002 Winter Olympics.

References

1975 births
Living people
Hungarian male alpine skiers
Olympic alpine skiers of Hungary
Alpine skiers at the 2002 Winter Olympics
Skiers from Budapest
20th-century Hungarian people